Prasmodon is a genus of braconid wasps in the family Braconidae. There are about 18 described species in Prasmodon, found in the Neotropics.

Species
These 18 species belong to the genus Prasmodon:

 Prasmodon almasolisae Fernández-Triana & Whitfield, 2014
 Prasmodon aureus Fernández-Triana & Whitfield, 2014
 Prasmodon bobpoolei Fernández-Triana & Whitfield, 2014
 Prasmodon bobrobbinsi Fernández-Triana & Whitfield, 2014
 Prasmodon dondavisi Fernández-Triana & Whitfield, 2014
 Prasmodon eminens Nixon, 1965
 Prasmodon erenadupontae Braet & Fernández-Triana, 2014
 Prasmodon johnbrowni Fernández-Triana & Whitfield, 2014
 Prasmodon masoni Fernández-Triana & Whitfield, 2014
 Prasmodon mikepoguei Fernández-Triana & Whitfield, 2014
 Prasmodon nixoni Fernández-Triana & Whitfield, 2014
 Prasmodon paulgoldsteini Fernández-Triana & Whitfield, 2014
 Prasmodon scottmilleri Fernández-Triana & Whitfield, 2014
 Prasmodon silvatlanticus Fernández-Triana & Whitfield, 2014
 Prasmodon subfuscus Fernández-Triana & Whitfield, 2014
 Prasmodon tijucaensis Fernández-Triana & Whitfield, 2014
 Prasmodon verhoogdenokus Braet & Fernández-Triana, 2014
 Prasmodon zlotnicki Valerio & Rodriguez, 2005

References

Microgastrinae